Centaurea atropurpurea is a species of Centaurea found in Romania and the Balkan Peninsula.

References

External links

atropurpurea